Morgan Larson (born March 4, 1971) is an American sailor.

Larson was born in Santa Cruz, California, and attended the College of Charleston where he was the Collegiate Men's Singlehanded National Champion and three-time All-American sailor.

He has sailed in the 2000 Louis Vuitton Cup with AmericaOne, the 2003 Louis Vuitton Cup with One World Challenge and the 2007 Louis Vuitton Cup with Victory Challenge. He sailed in the 2010 Louis Vuitton Trophy with Mascalzone Latino.

He has also participated in the Extreme Sailing Series as Tactician/Helm on Team Alinghi.

References

External links 
 

1971 births
Living people
American male sailors (sport)
College of Charleston alumni
People from Santa Cruz, California
49er class sailors
Extreme Sailing Series sailors
Alinghi sailors
2007 America's Cup sailors
2003 America's Cup sailors
2000 America's Cup sailors
College of Charleston Cougars sailors